Losers Weepers is a studio album by the American blues artist Etta James, released in 1971.

The title track peaked at No. 94 on the Billboard Hot 100.

Critical reception
Music Week wrote that "although [James] was in a bad way with narcotics addiction at the time, she turns in some formidable genre-defying vocals encompassing blues, R&B, jazz and deep soul."

Track listing

References

1971 albums
Etta James albums
Albums produced by Ralph Bass
Cadet Records albums